Molomix is the second album by the Mexican band Molotov. It's a remix album from their previous production ¿Dónde Jugarán Las Niñas?. It also includes two new songs "El Carnal de las Estrellas", which is an attack to the Mexican broadcasting company Televisa after its denial to run their music videos, and "Rap, Soda y Bohemia" (their version of "Bohemian Rhapsody"), which was also included on a compilation album titled, "Tributo a Queen" It also includes two videos, listed as songs 11 and 12.

Track listing

 El Carnal de las Estrellas (Intro) - 4:44
 Puto (Mijangos Hard Mix) - 7:00
 Gimme tha Power (Urban Mix) - 3:53
 Cerdo (Porcino Mix) - 3:38
 Voto Latino Remix - 2:57
 Puto (M+M Electrónic Dub) - 6:49
 Cerdo Radio Mix - 2:45
 Gimme Tha Power (Drum'n Bass Mix) - 3:42
 Puto MD Extended Mix / "Chinga Tu Madre" - 6:59
 Rap, Soda y Bohemia - 4:03
 Puto (Video)
 Que no te haga bobo Jacobo (Video)

Apocalypshit
1999 remix albums
Universal Records remix albums
Albums produced by Gustavo Santaolalla